Victoria Frances Nourse (born November 9, 1958) is a Ralph V. Whitworth Professor of Law at the Georgetown University Law Center and the executive director of the Center on Congressional Studies at Georgetown Law. A nominee for the United States Court of Appeals for the Seventh Circuit, pursuant to the rules of the Senate, her nomination was returned to the president on December 17, 2011, after the Senate adjourned for more than 30 days. Her nomination was not resubmitted by the president. From 2014 to 2015, she served as counsel to Vice President Joe Biden.

Early life and education
Nourse was born in Dunedin, Florida and received her Bachelor of Arts from Stanford University in 1980 and later received a Juris Doctor from the University of California, Boalt Hall School of Law in 1984.

Career
After graduating from law school, Nourse clerked for Edward Weinfeld of the United States District Court for the Southern District of New York in 1984 and 1985. From 1985 to 1987 and during the winter of 1988, she worked in for the law firm of Paul, Weiss, Rifkind, Wharton & Garrison. In 1987 she worked as an assistant counsel on the United States Senate Committee to Investigate the Iran-Contra Affair.

During 1988 to 1990, Nourse was an appellate attorney with the United States Department of Justice working in the civil division. From 1990 to 1993, she worked as counsel and special counsel for the United States Senate Judiciary Committee and was heavily involved in writing the Violence Against Women Act (VAWA). She did this work under then-Senator   Joe Biden. This generated national controversy when Biden attempted to claim he was the author of VAWA.

Her historic battle to uphold VAWA is documented in many books, including "Equal: Women Reshape American Law" By Fred Strebeigh. In this book she was included alongside Supreme Court Justice Ruth Bader Ginsburg as a woman who had a history-changing effect on the law.

From 1996 to 1997, Nourse was a visiting professor of law at the University of Maryland School of Law. From 1997 to 2002,  Nourse was an Associate Professor of Law at the University of Wisconsin Law School During the fall semester of 2002, she was a visiting professor of law at Yale Law School and taught law at New York University School of Law in the spring of 2003.  Nourse returned to the University of Wisconsin Law School from 2005 until 2008 as the Burrus-Bascom Professorship. From 2008 to 2010, Nourse was the LQC Lamar Professor of Law at Emory University School of Law in Atlanta.

In February 2019, Nourse was installed as the inaugural Ralph V. Whitworth Professor of Law and the Georgetown University Law Center.

Consideration for Seventh Circuit
On January 22, 2010, United States Senators Herb Kohl and Russ Feingold forwarded four names to the Obama White House for consideration to fill the vacancy on the Seventh Circuit Court of Appeals created when Judge Terence T. Evans assumed senior status.  Nourse was recommended along with District Court Judge Lynn Adelman, Richard Sankovitz, and Dean Strang. On July 14, 2010, Obama nominated Nourse to the vacancy. Her nomination was returned to the President on December 17, 2011, pursuant to the rules of the Senate.

Personal
Nourse is the daughter-in-law of United States federal judge Richard D. Cudahy who was a Judge of the United States Court of Appeals for the Seventh Circuit.

See also
Barack Obama judicial appointment controversies

References

1958 births
Living people
20th-century American women lawyers
20th-century American lawyers
21st-century American women lawyers
21st-century American lawyers
Emory University faculty
Georgetown University Law Center faculty
Paul, Weiss, Rifkind, Wharton & Garrison people
People from Dunedin, Florida
Stanford University alumni
UC Berkeley School of Law alumni
University of Wisconsin–Madison faculty